Chrysotropia is a genus of insects belonging to the family Chrysopidae.

Species:
 Chrysotropia ciliata

References

Chrysopidae
Neuroptera genera